Kang Han-na（; born January 30, 1989) is a South Korean actress. Kang played several lead roles in films and television series, including Moon Lovers: Scarlet Heart Ryeo (2016), Rain or Shine (2017), Familiar Wife (2018), Start-Up (2020), and My Roommate Is a Gumiho (2021).

Early life and education
Kang Han-Na received both her Bachelor and Master of Theater from Chung-Ang University.

Career

2009–2015: Career beginnings
Kang made her film debut in the short films, Last Homecoming and King of Guitar, both in 2009.

In 2013, she began playing minor roles in mainstream films Fasten Your Seatbelt, Commitment and Friend: The Great Legacy. The same year, Kang made her television debut in the romantic comedy drama Miss Korea.

Kang played her first lead role in the period film Empire of Lust, playing a gisaeng. She then starred in the short film, Stand in the same year.

2016–present: Rising popularity
Kang rose to fame with her role as an evil queen in the historical drama Moon Lovers: Scarlet Heart Ryeo. She was nominated for the "Excellence Award, Actress in a Fantasy Drama" at the 2016 SBS Drama Awards and "Best New Actress" at the 53rd Baeksang Arts Awards.

Kang was then cast in the romance melodrama Rain or Shine in 2017. The same year, she played a minor role in the Chinese drama Candle in the Tomb: Mu Ye Gui Shi.

In 2018, she starred in the romance comedy drama Familiar Wife.

In 2019, Kang was cast in the thriller drama Designated Survivor: 60 Days, based on the American series Designated Survivor. The same year she starred in a short drama of Drama Stage titled Woman with a Bleeding Ear about a woman who one day starts bleeding from her ears when she hears something she doesn't want to hear.

She was also confirmed to take over Volume Up as a new DJ starting from January 6, 2020.

In 2020, Kang starred in the tvN drama Start-Up as a successful businesswoman. In October 2020, Kang's contract with Fantagio ended and she signed on to KeyEast.

In 2021, Kang starred in My Roommate Is a Gumiho.

In 2022, Kang has been cast in KBS2's historical drama series Bloody Heart (Also known as Red Single Heart) alongside Lee Joon. In the drama Kang plays the role of Yoo Jeong.

Filmography

Film

Television series

Web series

Television shows

Radio

Awards and nominations

References

External links
 Official website at KeyEast 

South Korean film actresses
South Korean television actresses
South Korean television personalities
Living people
1989 births
Actresses from Seoul
Chung-Ang University alumni
21st-century South Korean actresses